Ansgars Church (Danish: Ansgars Kirke) is a church in Odense, Denmark, within the Diocese of Funen. 

Completed in 1902, it was the first church built in the city since the Middle Ages. The church was designed by Niels Jacobsen in a late Romanesque style from red brick, and built on granite foundation. There are three mural paintings inside the church: the 1902 work is a decoration on vault rubs, the 1917 frescoes are in the parish hall, and the 1935–1936 frescoes on the altar's niche.

References

Churches completed in 1902
Churches in Odense
Churches in the diocese of Funen